The Diocese of Ston  (also Diocese of Stagno or Diocese of Sagona) was a Roman Catholic diocese in Croatia, located in the city of Stagno. In 1828 it was suppressed to the Archdiocese of Dubrovnik.

History
800: Established (from Diocese of Ragusa) as Diocese of Ston (Dioecesis Stagnensis)
1300: Suppressed (to establish Diocese of Korčula) 
1541: Restored as Diocese of Ston (from Diocese of Korčula) 
 June 30, 1828: Suppressed (to the Archdiocese of Dubrovnik) via the papal bull, Locum Beati Petri, issued by Pope Leo XII on 30 June 1828.
1933: Restored as Titular Episcopal See of Ston

Ordinaries

Diocese of Ston

Tommaso Malombra (7 Feb 1463 – 1513 Died) 
Nicolò Niconisi (1513 – 1541 Died) 
Tommaso Cervino, O.P. (2 Dec 1541 – 1551 Resigned) 
Pietro de Gozzo, O.P. (25 Feb 1551 – 1564 Died) 
Boniface of Ragusa, O.F.M. (17 Nov 1564 – 1582 Died) 
Basilio Gradi, O.S.B. (14 Mar 1584 – 1585 Died) 
Crisostomo Arameo, O.S.B. (18 Mar 1585 – 1605 Died) 
Giovanni Battista Giorgi, O.S.B. (14 Aug 1606 – 24 Nov 1608 Died) 
Michael Rezzi (Resti) (28 Sep 1609 – 9 Jul 1614 Appointed, Bishop of Nusco) 
Ambrogio Gozzeo, O.P. (23 Mar 1615 – 13 Jul 1632 Died) 
Ludovico Giamagna, O.P. (24 Nov 1632 – Jul 1634 Died) 
Paolo de Gratiis (9 Jul 1635 – 1652 Died) 
Carlo Giuliani (bishop), O.P. (3 Feb 1653 – 3 Nov 1663 Died)
Pietro Luccari (23 Jun 1664 – 23 Nov 1679 Died) 
Giacinto Maria Passati, O.P. (13 May 1680 – 8 Aug 1680 Died)
Agostino Flavio Macedonich, O.F.M. (27 Jan 1681 – 14 Dec 1682 Died) 
Giovanni Battista Natali (bishop), O.P. (15 Nov 1683 – 4 Aug 1687 Died)  
Carlo Olantes, O.P. (31 May 1688 – 10 Nov 1692 Died) 
Giaconto Tuartkovich, O.F.M. (13 Apr 1693 – Jan 1694 Died) 
Alfonso Basilio Ghetaldo, O.S.B. (19 Jul 1694 – 12 Sep 1702 Died)
Vincenzo Lupi, O.F.M. (4 Jun 1703 – 3 Nov 1709 Died) 
Francesco Volanti (7 May 1710 – 8 Apr 1741 Died) 
Angelo Maria (Jean Luc) Volanti, O.P. (3 Jul 1741 – 25 Jun 1744 Died) 
Hijacint Marija Milković, O.P. (21 Jun 1745 – 20 Mar 1752 Appointed, Archbishop of Dubrovnik) 
Pietro Budmani (17 Jul 1752 – 2 Apr 1772 Died) 
Francesco Maria Sorgo Bobali, O.F.M. (7 Sep 1772 – 29 Jun 1800 Died) 
Antonio Raffaele Dolci, O.P. (20 Oct 1800 – 1807 Died)

References

Roman Catholic dioceses in Croatia
History of Dalmatia